Jimboomba is a town and locality in the City of Logan, Queensland, Australia.

Geography

The western part of Jimboomba is bordered by the new suburb of Glenlogan and the Logan River; the only bridge within the locality is Payne Bridge on Cusack Lane. There is a low-level older bridge immediately to the north of Payne Bridge but this cannot be used by vehicular traffic.

The Queensland Government's current plan is that Jimboomba will become a major residential and business area within the Brisbane metropolitan region, as part of the Greater Flagstone Priority Development Area, which will house up to 150,000 additional residents in coming decades.

Although historically a rural area, as at 2021, the land use in Jimboomba is almost entirely residential.

History
The original spelling was Gimboomba, named after a sheep and livestock station based where the township is today, stretching some distance north, east and south to neighbouring areas.  Gimboomba is a Gugingin word (the First Australian peoples of the area, of Yugambeh country) meaning place of loud thunder and little rain.  A culture trail celebrating First Australian culture is based at a local primary school bearing the name 'Loud Thunder' paying respect to its traditional owners. It was leased for grazing in those days and was taken up by Thomas Dowse during 1845–48. It was then transferred to Sydney publican Robert Rowlands and was later taken up by Andrew Inglis Henderson in 1851 to be used as a sheep run and subsequently for cattle grazing.

Jimboomba railway station was on the disused Beaudesert railway line from Bethania to Beaudesert that was established to service the abattoir in Beaudesert. The line opened on 16 May 1888. The line was closed in 1995 and then reopened and operated as a tourist service as far as Logan Village by railway enthusiasts from 1999 until mid-2004. Funds were harder to raise and depleted quickly for the line so it was closed permanently.

Jimboomba Timber Reserve Provisional School opened circa 1899. In 1906 it was renamed Martindale Provisional School. On 1 January 1909 it became Martindale State School. It was in the area of Gittins Road (now in Riverbend, approx ). It closed in 1922. The school building was then relocated to Cedar Grove, where it opened as Cedar Grove State School in 1923. It closed in 1965.

Jimboomba Provisional School opened on 12 May 1890, becoming Jimboomba State School on 1 June 1900.

Emmaus Primary School opened in 2002. Sponsored by Brisbane Catholic Education, the school was established as an ecumenical school in association with the local Anglican, Lutheran and Uniting Church communities. In 2005 it was renamed Emmaus College in preparation for adding secondary education in 2006.

Formerly in the Shire of Beaudesert, Jimboomba became part of Logan City following the local government amalgamations in March 2008.

South Queensland Academy (SQA), a Japanese international school, opened in Jimboomba in 1992. It closed in 2006. It was located at Lot 4, Johanna Street. It was replaced by the Hills International College.

On 29 September 2017, areas in the east of the locality were excised to create the new localities of Glenlogan and Riverbend and to allow for the expansion of the boundaries of Flagstone and South Maclean.

Demographics
The median age of the Jimboomba population was 34 years, 4 years below the national median of 38. 78.75% of people living in Jimboomba were born in Australia. The other top responses for country of birth were New Zealand 5.2%, England 4.8%, Scotland 0.6%, South Africa 0.6%, Scotland 0.5%, Netherlands 0.4%. 91% of people spoke only English at home; the next most common languages were 0.5% Hmong, 0.3% Cantonese, 0.2% Dutch, 0.2% German, 0.2% Japanese.

Economy
Historic industries are timber-getting and the grazon of sheep and cattle  However, Jimboomba now has a growing industrial area that provides services for vehicles, irrigation and home-water supplies, produce supplies, light manufacturing and landscape gardening.

Education
Jimboomba State School is a government primary (Prep-6) school for boys and girls at Mount Lindesay Highway. In 2018, the school had an enrolment of 837 students with 60 teachers (54 full-time equivalent) and 38 non-teaching staff (22 full-time equivalent). It includes a special education program.

Emmaus College is an ecumenical primary and secondary (Prep-12) school for boys and girls at 48 East Street. In 2018, the school had an enrolment of 1,379 students with 86 teachers (83 full-time equivalent) and 49 non-teaching staff (41 full-time equivalent).

Hills International College is a private primary and secondary (Prep-12) school for boys and girls at Lot 4 Johanna Street. In 2018, the school had an enrolment of 487 students with 45 teachers (42 full-time equivalent) and 29 non-teaching staff (26 full-time equivalent).

There is no government seondary school in Jimboomba. The nearest government secondary schools are Flagstone State Community College in Flagstone to the west and Park Ridge State High School in Park Ridge to the north.

Facilities
It has a large number of services, including a Fire and Rescue (auxiliary) station and permanent ambulance service, a police station, a State Emergency Services depot, domestic shopping, hotel, and medical-dental services.

The Logan City Council operate a public library at 18 - 22 Honora Street.

Greater Flagstone urban development
The suburb of Flagstone started off on the eastern side of the Sydney to Brisbane railway line and has now expanded west over the railway line where the proposed town centre will be constructed. More residential developments are starting in Undullah and will expand north into South Maclean, Monarch Glen, Flinders Lakes, Silverbark Ridge, New Beith and Greenbank. This is known as the Greater Flagstone development area. Final approval for the project was granted in October 2011.

Sport and recreation 
A number of well-known sporting teams represent the local area, including the Jimboomba Thunder, the rugby league club that plays home games at Jimboomba Park and the Jimboomba Redbacks AFL  club that plays home games at Glenlogan Park. Glenlogan Park is also home to the Jimboomba Cricket Club. 

There are large numbers of horses kept on or near residential properties for riding, for pleasure and for competition.

Jimboomba is home to the Jimboomba X Stadium, Jimboomba's own extreme sports outdoor venue. Holding events such as 2014 QLD Supercross Championship, 2015 QLD Stadium X Series & two rounds of the 2015 Australian Supercross Championship, Jimboomba X Stadium is located at Hills International College grounds. The opening round of the 2016 Australian Supercross Championship is set to be held at the Jimboomba X Stadium on 17 September.

In popular culture 

In Civilization: Beyond Earth, "Jimboomba" is the default name for the second colony established by the Polystralian faction.

References

External links

 

Suburbs of Logan City
Populated places established in 1845
1845 establishments in Australia
Localities in Queensland